Qaleh-ye Ali or Qaleh Ali may refer to:
Qaleh-ye Ali, Hamaijan, Sepidan County, Fars Province
Qaleh-ye Ali, Shesh Pir, Sepidan County, Fars Province
Qaleh-ye Ali, Lorestan